Constance of Aragon (1343 – 2/18 July 1363), was the first Queen consort of Frederick III the Simple. She was an infanta of Aragon, the eldest child of Peter IV of Aragon and his first wife Maria of Navarre. Her father unsuccessfully proposed her as heir to the throne in early 1347, in the absence of a male heir.

On 8 February 1351 at Perpignan, a betrothal between Constance and Louis I of Anjou, son of King John II of France, was performed. However, the marriage never took place.

On 11 April 1361 at Catania, Constance married King Frederick III of Sicily. They had one daughter, Maria (2 July 1363 - 25 March 1401), who succeeded her father as reigning Queen of Sicily in 1377 and married Martin of Aragon.

In 1363 Constance died in Catania, Sicily, either from the plague, or following childbirth complications. She is buried in the Cathedral of Catania.

Ancestors

References

External links

Constanza de Aragón
Ancestors of Constanza de Aragón

1343 births
1363 deaths
Royal consorts of Sicily
Aragonese infantas
Burials at Catania Cathedral
14th-century Italian women
14th-century Sicilian people
14th-century Spanish women
14th-century people from the Kingdom of Aragon
Deaths in childbirth
Daughters of kings
Remarried royal consorts